The weather extremes in Pakistan include extremely high and extremely low temperatures, heaviest rainfalls and floodings. Pakistan has one of the highest temperature ranges in the world (temperature range refers to the difference between highest and lowest recorded temperatures ever) with proven weather conditions ranging from as high as like those in the Sahara desert, to as low as those like in Alaska making it one of the most climatically diverse countries in the world. It was not only the hottest temperature ever recorded in Pakistan but also the hottest reliably measured temperature ever recorded on the continent of Asia and the fourth-highest temperature ever recorded on Earth. That record-breaking rain fell in just 10 hours.

Temperature 
The standard measuring conditions for temperature are 1.2 meters above the ground out of direct sunlight (hence the term, x degrees "in the shade").

High temperature 
Heat waves mostly occur during summer months but in Pakistan heat waves occur at any time period between April and September and bring high temperatures but most powerful heat waves occur in May and June. Some areas of southern Pakistan usually experience above  temperature and play havoc in these areas. The most deadly heat wave in the history of Pakistan is the record-breaking heat wave of summer 2010 which occurred in the last ten days of May. Heat spreads throughout the north-central part of the country including Punjab and KPK.

List of cities with temperature of 50 °C or above 
Temperature extremes in Pakistan over  based on data from the Pakistan Meteorological Department, 1931–2022 and other sources

List of cities with temperature of 45 °C or above but below 50 °C 
Temperature extremes in Pakistan over  based on data from the Pakistan Meteorological Department, 1931–2020 and other sources.

Record breaking heat wave of April 2017 

A severe heat wave with temperatures as high as  hit Pakistan, especially southern parts, in April 2017. This heat wave broke the old temperature records of many cities in the country in the month of April. Other cities of the country also broke their old records of highest maximum temperatures in the month of April.

Recorded temperatures 
Extreme temperatures started to affect the parts of the country from mid-April and peaked on 19–20 April.

Record breaking 2010 summer heat wave 
Twelve cities in Pakistan saw temperatures above  during the extreme heatwave of summer 2010, which lasted from May 22 to May 31, 2010. On May 27, temperatures higher than  hit areas across Pakistan and at least 18 people died as a result. Eleven cities also saw extremes of more than  but below .

Low temperature 
Cold waves mostly occur during winter months but in northern and western Pakistan cold waves occur at any time period between October and March and bring low temperatures but most powerful cold waves occur in December and January. Some areas of northern and western Pakistan usually experience below 0 °C temperature and play havoc in these areas. The coldest place in Pakistan can be the glacial parts of Gilgit Baltistan, where in winters the average temperature remains below -20. The K2 Peak has recorded -65 °C. The most deadly cold wave in the recent history of Pakistan is the record-breaking cold wave of winter 2020. Temperatures in the hottest places in Pakistan fell below 2 °C or more, as well as cities near the foothills of the Himalayas including Islamabad, Peshawar, Lahore can record temperatures below freezing. It is not uncommon for Islamabad to receive snow in strong cold spells, the Khyber Hills in Peshawar, Hayatabad can also receive light snowfall.

List of Some Important cities of Pakistan with temperature of 0 °C or below Official data (according to Pakistan Metrological Department)

Precipitation 
The standard way of measuring Rainfall or Snowfall is the standard Rain gauge, which can be found in 100-mm (4-in) plastic and 200-mm (8-in) metal varieties. Plastic gauges have markings on the inner cylinder down to  resolution, while metal gauges require use of a stick designed with the appropriate  markings. After the inner cylinder is filled, the amount inside it is discarded, then filled with the remaining Rainfall in the outer cylinder until all the fluid in the outer cylinder is gone, adding to the overall total until the outer cylinder is empty.

Rainfall
Pakistan receives Rainfall from both Monsoon and Western Disturbance. The Monsoon season occurs from July to September and brings a heavy downpour across the country except Western Balochistan. Western Disturbances occur from October to May and bring rainfall across the country with some heavy downpour in Northern Pakistan. But in June, Western Disturbances occasionally hit the northern parts of the country. Pre-Monsoon also occurs in this month occasionally but not always.

Heaviest rainfall in a single season 
Record-breaking rainfall extremes in Pakistan over in a single season, based on data from the Pakistan Meteorological Department, 1931–2022 and other sources.

Heaviest rainfall of 400 mm or above during 24 hours 

Heaviest rainfall of 200 mm or above but below 400 mm during 24 hours 

Record-breaking heavy rainfall of August 2022 in Sindh 

Monsoon 2022 started with a bang in early July and week long rains were already affecting Sindh. However, a low pressure area developed over Bay of Bengal, which became depression before hitting Northern Sindh on 18 August. The depression became stationary over the northern areas of the province and caused unprecedented record-breaking rainfall in Larkana, Naushahro Feroze, Kambar Shahdadkot, Khairpur, Jacobabad, Dadu, Nawabshah, Shikarpur and other districts till 22 August. Another low pressure area hit the same part of the province on 25 August and caused heavy to very heavy rainfall.

Heavy rainfall recorded during the month of August 2022 in Sindh 
Heavy rainfall of more than  recorded during the month of August 2022 in the province of Sindh particularly in Northern Sindh based on data from the Pakistan Meteorological Department.

Record-breaking heavy Rainfall of September 2014 

An August like Monsoonal moisture hit the country in the first week of the month when a very low air pressure system (29") was formed over Kashmir that moved eastward into Northern Pakistan. The spell caused torrential Rainfall between 1 and 5 September that resulted in devastation to life and property. The last two days of the spell being extremely wet in Pakistan caused River Chenab, Jhelum, Ravi, Sutlej and Indus to overflow their banks.

Heavy Rainfall recorded during the wet spell of September 2014 
Heavy Rainfall of more than  recorded during the wet spell of September 1 to 5, 2014 in northern Pakistan based on data from the Pakistan Meteorological Department.

Record-breaking heavy rainfall of September 2012 in Sindh 

After the severe drought conditions in Sindh during the months of July and August, an intense low-pressure area developed in Bay of Bengal in last days of August. The low-pressure area moved towards Sindh and brought torrential rains in Upper Sindh while rainfall, some heavy in other parts of Sindh during the first fortnight of September 2012. Larkana division was worst hit by heavy rainfall.

Heavy rainfall recorded during the wet spell of September 2012 in Sindh 
Heavy rainfall of more than  recorded during the wet spell of September 5 to 11, 2012 in the province of Sindh particularly in Upper Sindh based on data from the Pakistan Meteorological Department.

Record-breaking torrential rainfall of August and September 2011 in Sindh 

In the month of July Pakistan received below normal monsoon rains; however, in August and September the country received above normal monsoon rains. A strong weather pattern entered the areas of Sindh from the Indian states of Rajasthan and Gujarat in August and gained strength with the passage of time and caused heavy Downpour. The first Monsoon spell hit the southern parts of Sindh on 10 August. It produced record breaking widespread torrential Rainfall and resulted in floods in district Badin. The second spell hit the areas on 30 August and lasted until 2 September. In the month of September four more consecutive spells of monsoon rainfall devastated the southern parts of the province. The first spell of September hit the already inundated parts of the province on 2 September. Thereafter, the second spell hit on 5 September, the third on 9 September, and the fourth on 12 September 2011. The four spells of Monsoon produced even more devastating torrential Rains in the already affected areas of Sindh.

Heavy rainfall recorded during the wet spells of August and September 2011 in Sindh 
Heavy rainfall of more than  recorded in the heaviest Monsoon spell in different areas of Sindh province in the months of August and September, 2011 based on data from the Pakistan Meteorological Department.

 September 1 to 14, 2011 four consecutive spells of monsoon rains in Sindh.
 August 1 to 14, 2011 first spell of monsoon rains in Sindh.
 August 30 to September 4 second spell of monsoon rains in Sindh.

Record-breaking heavy rainfall of July 2010 
Unprecedented heavy monsoon rains began in the last week of July 2010 in the Khyber Pakhtunkhwa, Punjab, Gilgit-Baltistan and Azad Kashmir regions of Pakistan which causes floods in Balochistan and Sindh. The floods which were caused by monsoon rains, and were forecast to continue into early August, were described as the worst in the last 80 years. A record-breaking  of rain fell in Peshawar in 24 hours, previously  of rain was recorded in April 2009. Other record-breaking Rains were recorded in Risalpur, Cherat, Saidu Sharif, Mianwali, and Kohat regions of Khyber Pakhtunkhwa.

Heavy rainfall recorded during the wet spell of July 2010 
Heavy Rainfall of more than  recorded during the four-day wet spell of July 27 to 30, 2010 in the provinces of Khyber Pakhtunkhwa and Punjab, based on data from the Pakistan Meteorological Department.

Snowfall 
Pakistan receives snowfall from Western Disturbance. Western Disturbances bring snowfall from November to February across the mountainous and hilly areas of the country with some heavy snowfall in northern mountains and hills of Pakistan. Blizzards are common in northern mountains of the country. In February 2017, at least 14 people were killed and 9 injured by an avalanche in the Sher Shall area of Chitral district.

Heaviest snowfall of 40" or above during 24 hours 

Heaviest snowfall of 20" or above but below 40" during 24 hours 

Wind

Floods 

Pakistan has seen many floods, the worst and most destructive is the recent 2010 Pakistan floods, which swept away the 20% of Pakistan's land, the flood is the result of unprecedented monsoon rains which lasted from 28 July to 31 July 2010. Khyber Pakhtunkhwa and North eastern Punjab were badly affected during the monsoon rains when dams, rivers and lakes overflowed. By mid-August, according to the governmental Federal Flood Commission (FFC), the floods had caused the deaths of at least 1,540 people, while 2,088 people had received injuries, 557,226 houses had been destroyed, and over 6 million people had been displaced. One month later, the data had been updated to reveal 1,781 deaths, 2,966 people with injuries, and more than 1.89 million homes destroyed. The flood affected more than 20 million people exceeding the combined total of individuals affected by the 2004 Indian Ocean tsunami, the 2005 Kashmir earthquake and the 2010 Haiti earthquake. The flood is considered as worst in Pakistan's history affecting people of all four provinces and Gilgit Baltistan and Azad Kashmir. The climate in Pakistan is very unpredictable and extreme due to its geographical location with tropical plains and the world's highest peaks. Monsoon can be harsh due to close proximity with the monsoon areas of India, Bangladesh, Thailand, Myanmar. Floods in the mountainous regions of the country that cover about 70% of Pakistani Land can experience very dangerous landfall, avalanches, and the glaciers in the most distant and remote parts of the countries can bring danger to nearby villages.

The 2011 Sindh floods began during the Monsoon season in mid-August 2011, resulting from heavy Monsoon Rains in Sindh, Eastern Balochistan, and Southern Punjab. The floods have caused considerable damage; an estimated 270 civilians have been killed, with 5.3 million people and 1.2 million homes affected. Sindh is a fertile region and often called the "breadbasket" of the country; the damage and toll of the floods on the local agrarian economy is said to be extensive. At least 1.7 million acres of arable land has been inundated as a result of the flooding. The flooding has been described as the worst since the 2010 Pakistan floods, which devastated the entire country. Unprecedented torrential monsoon rains caused severe flooding in 16 districts of Sindh province.

The other floods which caused destruction in the history of Pakistan, includes the flood of 1950, which killed 2910 people, On 1 July 1977 heavy Rains and flooding in Karachi, killed 248 people, according to Pakistan meteorological department  of Rain fell in 24 hours. In 1992 flooding during Monsoon season killed 1,834 people across the country, in 1993 flooding during monsoon rains killed 3,084 people, in 2003 Sindh province was badly affected due to monsoon rains causing damages in billions, killed 178 people, while in 2007 Cyclone Yemyin submerged lower part of Balochistan Province in sea water killing 380 people. Before that it killed 213 people in Karachi on its way to Balochistan.

See also 
 2010 Pakistan floods
 2011 Sindh floods
 2014 India–Pakistan floods
 2015 Pakistan heat wave
 Climate of Pakistan
 Drought in Pakistan
 List of floods in Pakistan
 List of weather records
 Tropical cyclones and tornadoes in Pakistan

Notes 

A.  Indicates new record. Record-breaking extreme heat wave observed in the plain areas of Punjab, Sindh and Balochistan where  or more was observed in 12 cities between 22 to 27 May 2010. Previous extreme heat wave conditions were observed in 1998, 2002 and 2007.
B.  Indicates new record. Record-breaking monsoon rains observed during the month of July, 2010 in northeastern Punjab, Khyber Pakhtunkhwa, and Azad Kashmir.

References

External links 
 Pakistan Meteorological Department

Weather events in Pakistan
Climate of Pakistan
Environment of Pakistan
Pakistan
extreme weather records
Pakistan
Climate change in Pakistan